Brigadoon is the third album by the rock group The Ancestors.

Track listing
All songs written by Joe Longo.

Note
The track listing, as seen here, lists a total of 21 tracks on the disc.  However, tracks 13-20 are untitled and deliberately left silent, much like some hidden tracks are.  This gap of silence lasts for 9:34.

Personnel

The Ancestors
Joe Longo: Bass, Acoustic Guitar, Vocals
Sharkey McEwen: Electric and Acoustic Guitars, Backing Vocals
Felicia Lloyd: Keyboards Flute, Vocals
Brian Hardgroove: Drums, Percussion, Bass, Backing Vocals

Additional Personnel
Alistair Farrant: Keyboards on tracks 1, 6, 8, 11 and 12
Bob Muller: Drums and Percussion on tracks 1, 6, 8 and 11
Buz Altimare, Takeshi Yonemura: Drums on track 11
Jerry Cuccurullo: Drums on track 2
Amafujo, Maureen Wilson, Yvette Doughty: Backing Vocals on track 11

References 
 Brigadoon at allmusic.com
 Brigadoon at discogs.com

1994 albums
The Ancestors (band) albums
Albums produced by Eddie Kramer